Into It may refer to:

"Into It" (Camila Cabello song), from her debut album Camila (2018)
"Into It", song by Nels Cline Singers from the 2010 album Initiate
"Into It", song by  Robert Pollard from the 2011 album Space City Kicks

See also
Get Into It (disambiguation)
Into It. Over It., indie rock solo project by Evan Thomas Weiss